The Tropicana Laughlin (formerly Ramada Express and Tropicana Express) is a casino hotel in Laughlin, Nevada. It is owned by Gaming and Leisure Properties and operated by Caesars Entertainment. The hotel has 1,498 guest rooms and suites, located in the 12-story Casino Tower and the 24-story Promenade Tower. The casino has 1,050 slot machines and 21 table games. It includes the restaurants: The Steakhouse, Passaggio Italian Gardens, Carnegie's Café, Taqueria Del Rio, Poolside Café, Dips & Dogs and Victory Plaza.

History
In June 1988, the property opened under the name Ramada Express. In 1993, an expansion was completed that included the Promenade Tower, the Town Square area, additional casino space and restaurants, and a parking garage. In May 2007, Columbia Sussex announced that the Ramada Express would change its name to the Tropicana Express. The hotel opened as the Tropicana Express on July 28, 2007. It was later renamed as Tropicana Laughlin in 2009.

In 2018, Gaming and Leisure Properties (GLP) acquired the real estate of the Tropicana and Eldorado Resorts (later Caesars Entertainment) acquired its operating business, under lease from GLP, as part of the two companies' acquisition of Tropicana Entertainment.

In 2019, the Tropicana's buffet closed permanently.

Entertainment
The Tropicana has the Pavilion Theater, a  indoor entertainment venue. It also has Tango's Lounge, which has live entertainment, the Eclipse Bar and a premium slot lounge, the Grand Junction.

Railroad

The Tropicana formerly operated a  narrow gauge train in a loop on the grounds that could be ridden for free. Rolling stock consisted of open passenger cars, a  locomotive replica of the Virginia and Truckee No. 12 Genoa named No. 7 Gambler powered by a diesel engine inside its tender and a Plymouth Locomotive Works engine named No. 11 Lucky Lady used as a spare. The lobby and casino floor was adorned and decorated in a railroad theme with various mementos and artifacts from the historical railroad lines and companies from throughout the United States.

On April 14, 2012, Tropicana Entertainment donated the rolling stock to the Las Vegas Railroad Society. All equipment was trucked from Laughlin to be stored in Las Vegas. In April 2018, the rolling stock was placed on display at the Craig Ranch Regional Park in North Las Vegas. The tracks have since been torn out and all of the railroad memorabilia removed.

References

External links
 

1988 establishments in Nevada
3 ft gauge railways in the United States
Casino hotels
Casinos completed in 1988
Casinos in Laughlin, Nevada
Caesars Entertainment
Hotel buildings completed in 1988
Hotel buildings completed in 1993
Hotels established in 1988
Hotels in Laughlin, Nevada
Narrow gauge railroads in Nevada